Gbarpolu-2 is an electoral district for the elections to the House of Representatives of Liberia. The constituency covers Belleh District, Gounwolaila District and six communities of Bokomu District (Mollakwelle, Salayah, Gungbe-ta, Gbarkagborquoita, Zalakai, Porkpa-Ta).

Elected representatives

References

Electoral districts in Liberia